Fahad Al-Musaibeah is a Saudi football midfielder who played for Saudi Arabia in the 1984 Olympic Games.

International goals

Record at FIFA Tournaments

References

External links

1961 births
Living people
Saudi Arabian footballers
Saudi Arabia international footballers
Olympic footballers of Saudi Arabia
Footballers at the 1984 Summer Olympics
Saudi Professional League players
Al Hilal SFC players
1984 AFC Asian Cup players
1988 AFC Asian Cup players
AFC Asian Cup-winning players
Asian Games medalists in football
Footballers at the 1986 Asian Games
Footballers at the 1982 Asian Games
Asian Games silver medalists for Saudi Arabia
Asian Games bronze medalists for Saudi Arabia
Association football midfielders
Medalists at the 1982 Asian Games
Medalists at the 1986 Asian Games